Kostrzewski (feminine Kostrzewska) is a Polish surname. It may refer to:

 Barbara Kostrzewska, Polish singer and theatre director
 Franciszek Kostrzewski (1826–1911), Polish painter
 Józef Kostrzewski (1885–1969), Polish archeologist
 Mateusz Kostrzewski (born 1989), Polish professional basketball player
 Roman Kostrzewski (1960–2022), Polish heavy metal musician
 Stefan Kostrzewski, Polish sprinter

Polish-language surnames